The anime series Miss Kobayashi's Dragon Maid is based on a Japanese manga series of the same name written and illustrated by Coolkyousinnjya that is published on Futabasha's Monthly Action magazine. The series was directed by Yasuhiro Takemoto at Kyoto Animation and aired in Japan between 12 January and 6 April 2017. Yuka Yamada handled series composition, Miku Kadowaki designed the characters, Nobuaki Maruki served as chief animation director, and the music was composed by Masumi Itō. Crunchyroll simulcast the series as it aired while Funimation released an English dubbed version from 1 February 2017. An original video animation episode was released on the seventh Blu-ray/DVD compilation volume on 20 September 2017. Madman Entertainment will import Funimation's release into Australia and New Zealand.

A second season titled , the season aired between 8 July and 23 September 2021. was announced with the release of the eighth manga volume on 12 February 2019. Its status was unknown for a time following the death of Takemoto in the Kyoto Animation arson attack. Kyoto Animation returned to produce the season. Tatsuya Ishihara is replacing Takemoto as director, although Takemoto is credited as "series director" under Ishihara. Yuka Yamada returned to supervise the series' scripts, Masumi Itō returned as music composer, and Miku Kadowaki and Nobuaki Maruki returned as character designer and chief animation director, respectively. The cast members also returned to reprise their roles. An original video animation was released with the special "Volume S" Blu-ray/DVD volume on 19 January 2022. On the season finale, "Aozora no Rhapsody" plays as an ending theme.

Episode list

Season 1 (2017)

Season 2: Miss Kobayashi's Dragon Maid S (2021)

Miss Kobayashi's Dragon ○○

Miss Kobayashi's Dragon Maid S shorts

Notes

References

Miss Kobayashi's Dragon Maid